Freedom of religion in China may be referring to the following entities separated by the Taiwan Strait:

In the People's Republic of China (PRC), the freedom of religion is provided for in the Constitution of the People's Republic of China, yet with a caveat: the government controls what it calls "normal religious activity", defined in practice as activities that take place within government-sanctioned religious organizations and registered places of worship. Although the PRC's communist government claimed responsibility for the practice of religion, human rights bodies such as United States Commission on International Religious Freedom (USCIRF) have much criticized this differentiation as falling short of international standards for the protection of religious freedom.
In the Republic of China (ROC), it is provided for by the Constitution of the Republic of China, which is in force on Taiwan. The ROC's government generally respects freedom of religion in practice, with policies which contribute to the generally free practice of religion.

The long history in ROC's constraint of the freedom of religion is a prelude to that of the PRC; the ruling Chinese Communist Party (CCP) officially espouses state atheism, and has conducted antireligious campaigns to this end. China's five officially sanctioned religious organizations are the Buddhist Association of China, Chinese Taoist Association, Islamic Association of China, Three-Self Patriotic Movement and Catholic Patriotic Association. These groups have been overseen and controlled by the United Front Work Department of the Chinese Communist Party since the State Administration for Religious Affairs' absorption into the United Front Work Department in 2018. Unregistered religious groups—including house churches, Falun Gong, and underground Catholics—face varying degrees of harassment, including imprisonment and torture under Xi Jinping Administration. This is also compared to the ROC with PRC's strong neglect of human rights protections, state-sanctioned discrimination, and generally low regard for freedom of religion or belief. 
As for the Taiwan, Freedom House gave it the top score for religious freedoms in 2018. Possibly the only coercion to practice a certain faith in Taiwan comes from within the family, where the choice to adopt a non-traditional faith can sometimes lead to ostracism "because they stop performing ancestor worship rites and rituals."

Legal framework

Republic of China
The Constitution of the Republic of China provides for freedom of religion, and the authorities generally respect this right in practice. Authorities at all levels protect this right in full, and do not tolerate its abuse, either by official or private actors. There is no state religion.

According to Article 13 of the Constitution of the Republic of China of 1947:

Although registration is not mandatory, 26 religious organizations have registered with the MOI's Religious Affairs Section. Religious organizations may register with the central authorities through their island-wide associations under the Temple Management Law, the Civic Organizations Law, or the chapter of the Civil Code that governs foundations and associations. While individual places of worship may register with local authorities, many choose not to do so and operate as the personal property of their leaders. Registered religious organizations operate on a tax-free basis and are required to submit annual reports of their financial operations. The only ramification for nonregistration is the forfeiture of the tax advantages that are available for registered religious organizations. There were no reports that the authorities have sought to deny registration to new religions.

Religious organizations are permitted to operate schools, but compulsory religious instruction is not permitted in any public or private elementary, middle, or high school accredited by the Ministry of Education (MOE). High schools accredited by the MOE, while not allowed to require religious instruction, may provide elective courses in religious studies, provided such courses do not promote certain religious beliefs over others. Universities and research institutions may have religious studies departments. Before 2004, legislation barred religious schools and theological institutes from applying for MOE accreditation, and the MOE did not recognize university-level degrees granted by these types of schools. In March 2004, the Legislative Yuan revised the Private Schools Act authorized the MOE to establish an accreditation process for university-level religious education institutions supported by religious organizations or private funds. In April 2006, the MOE promulgated regulations governing the accreditation process. In August 2006, the MOE accredited its first seminary, the Dharma Drum Buddhist College.

People's Republic of China

Article 36 of the Constitution of the People's Republic of China of 1982 specifies that:

This protection is extended only to what are called "normal religious activities", generally understood to refer to religions that submit to state control via the State Administration for Religious Affairs.  The Constitution further forbids the use of religion to "engage in activities that disrupt social order, impair the health of citizens or interfere with the educational system of the state." Furthermore, it states that "[r]eligious organizations and religious affairs are not subject to any foreign dominance."

The law affords protection to five officially sanctioned religions: the Buddhist Association of China, Chinese Taoist Association, Islamic Association of China, Three-Self Patriotic Movement and Catholic Patriotic Association. Religious groups are required to register with the State Administration for Religious Affairs (SARA, formerly known as the central Religious Affairs Bureau) or its provincial and local offices (still known as Religious Affairs Bureaus (RABs)). SARA and the RABs are responsible for monitoring and judging the legitimacy of religious activity.

Proselytizing is only permitted in private settings or within registered houses of worship. Proselytization in public, in unregistered churches or temples, or by foreigners is prohibited. Members of the officially atheist Communist Party are strongly discouraged from holding religious faith.

A significant number of non-sanctioned churches and temples exist, attended by locals and foreigners alike. Unregistered or underground churches are not officially banned, but are not permitted to conduct religious activities. These bodies may face varying degrees of interference, harassment, and persecution by state and party organs. In some instances, unregistered religious believers and leaders have been charged with "illegal religious activities" or "disrupting social stability". Religious believers have also been charged under article 300 of the criminal code, which forbids using heretical organizations to "undermine the implementation of the law". An extrajudicial, Communist Party-led security organ called the 6-10 Office oversees the suppression of Falun Gong and, increasingly, other unregistered religious organizations.

Folk religions, though not officially protected, are sometimes tolerated by authorities. The State Administration for Religious Affairs has created a department to oversee the management of folk religion.

Although the Chinese Communist Party has a long history of restricting religious freedom, in recent years it has become increasingly hostile toward religion and has initiated campaigns to “sinicize" Islam, Tibetan Buddhism, and Christianity to rid them of what it deems “foreign" influences. The 2018 Revised Regulations on Religious Affairs effectively ban “unauthorized" religious teaching and expand the role of local authorities in controlling religious activities. In 2019, religious freedom conditions in China continued to deteriorate. The Chinese government has created a high-tech surveillance state, utilizing facial recognition and artificial intelligence to monitor religious minorities. On 1 April 2019, a new regulation requiring religious venues to have legal representatives and professional accountants went into effect. Some smaller religious venues, especially in rural areas, found these requirements impossible to fulfill.

Christianity

Christianity has had a presence in China dating as far back as the Tang dynasty, and accumulated a following in China with the arrival of large numbers of missionaries during the Qing dynasty. Missionaries were expelled from China in 1949 when the Communist Party came to power, and the religion was associated with Western imperialism.  However, Christianity experienced a resurgence of popularity since the reforms under Deng Xiaoping in the late 1970s and 1980s.  By 2011, approximately 60 million Chinese citizens were estimated to be practicing Protestantism or Catholicism. The majority of these do not belong to the state-sanctioned churches. The government declared in 2018 that there are over 44 million Christians in China.

In reports of countries with the strongest anti-Christian persecution, China was ranked by the Open Doors organisation in 2019 as the 27th most severe country and in 2020 as 23rd most severe. Religious practices are still often tightly controlled by government authorities. Chinese children in Mainland China are permitted to be involved with officially sanctioned Christian meetings through the Three-Self Patriotic Movement or the Catholic Patriotic Association. In early January 2018, Chinese authorities in Shanxi province demolished a church, which created a wave of fear among the Christians.

Roman Catholicism

China is home to an estimated 12 million Catholics, the majority of whom worship outside the official Catholic Patriotic Association (CPA). The State Administration for Religious Affairs states that there are 5.3 million Catholics belonging to the state-sanctioned Catholic Patriotic Association, which oversees 70 bishops, and approximately 6,000 churches nationwide. In addition, there are roughly 40 bishops unordained by the CPA who operate unofficially, and recognize the authority of the Vatican.

The state-sanctioned church appoints its own bishops, and as with all official religious, exercises control over the doctrine and leadership of the religion. As a matter of maintaining autonomy and rejecting foreign intervention, the official church has no official contact with the Vatican, and does not recognize its authority.  However, the CPA has allowed for unofficial Vatican approval of ordinations. Although the CPA continues to carry out ordinations opposed by the Holy See, the majority of CPA bishops are now recognized by both authorities. In addition to overseeing the practice of the Catholic faith, the CPA espouses politically oriented objectives as well. Liu Bainian, chairman of the CPA and the Bishops Conference of the Catholic Church in China, stated in a 2011 interview that the church needed individuals who "love the country and love religion: politically, they should respect the Constitution, respect the law, and fervently love the socialist motherland."

Some Catholics who recognize the authority of the Holy See choose to worship clandestinely due to the risk of harassment from authorities. Several underground Catholic bishops have been reported disappeared or imprisoned, and harassment of unregistered bishops and priests is common. There are reports of Catholic bishops and priests being forced by authorities to attend the ordination ceremonies for bishops who had not gained Vatican approval. Chinese authorities also have reportedly pressured Catholics to break communion with the Vatican by requiring them to renounce an essential belief in Roman Catholicism, the primacy of the Roman Pontiff. In other instances, however, authorities have permitted Vatican-loyal churches to carry out operations.

Protestantism

The Three-Self Patriotic Movement, National Committee of the Three-Self Patriotic Movement of the Protestant Churches in China; the Three-Self Church or "TSPM" is the government-sanctioned ("patriotic") Christian organization in China.  Known in combination with the China Christian Council as the lianghui, they form the only state-sanctioned ("registered") Protestant church in mainland China. All other Protestant denominations are illegal.

Chinese house churches are a religious movement of unregistered assemblies of Christians in China, which operate independently of the government-run Three-Self Patriotic Movement (TSPM) and China Christian Council (CCC) for Protestant groups and the Catholic Patriotic Association (CPA) and the Chinese Catholic Bishops Council (CCBC) for Catholics. They are also known as the "Underground" Church or the "Unofficial" Church, although this is somewhat of a misnomer as they are collections of unrelated individual churches rather than a single unified church. They are called "house churches" because as they are not officially registered organizations, they cannot independently own property and hence they meet in private houses, often in secret for fear of arrest or imprisonment.

Others outside the mainland
Several foreign missionary religious groups are also present outside mainland China. The Church of Scientology, The Church of Jesus Christ of Latter-day Saints (Mormons) and the Unification Church are registered. Other Christian denominations present include Presbyterians, the True Jesus Church, Baptists, Lutherans, Seventh-day Adventists, and Episcopalians. 

Approximately 70 percent of the 475,000 Aborigines of Taiwan are Christian. Jehovah's Witnesses are outlawed in Mainland China (except in the territories of Hong Kong and Macau with up to 5,975 members in the two territories and 11,284 members in the Taiwan Area.)

Buddhism

Tibetan Buddhism

China took full control of Tibet in 1959. In the wake of the takeover and especially during the cultural revolution many monasteries were destroyed and many monks and laypeople killed.  The 14th Dalai Lama fled to India and has since ceded temporal power to an elected government-in-exile. The current Dalai Lama has attempted to negotiate with the Chinese authorities for greater autonomy and religious freedom for Tibet. As various high-ranking Lamas in the country have died, the authorities have proposed their own candidates on the religious authorities, which has led at times to rival claimants to the same position. In an effort to control this, the Chinese government passed a law in 2007 requiring a Reincarnation Application be completed and approved for all lamas wishing to reincarnate.

The present incarnation of the Panchen Lama is disputed. The Dalai Lama recognises Gedhun Choekyi Nyima; however, the Chinese government recognises Gyaincain Norbu as the incarnation of the 11th Panchen Lama. Exile Tibetan sources allege that Gedhun Choekyi Nyima was kidnapped by the Chinese government. The identity of the Panchen Lama is of critical importance to Tibetan Buddhism because he is one of the authorities that must approve the next Dalai Lama.

Judaism

There are also a small number of adherents of Judaism in Taiwan, mainly expatriates. In mainland China, there are 2,800 Kaifeng Jews.

Taoism
Taoist practitioners are required to register with the PRC-controlled Chinese Taoist Association (CTA), which exercises control over religious doctrine and personnel. Local governments restrict the construction of Taoist temples and statues, and call for abandonment of practices they deem to be "superstitious" or "feudal". The CTA dictates the proper interpretation of Taoist doctrine, and exhorts Taoist practitioners to support the Communist Party and the state. For example, a Taoist scripture reading class held by the CTA in November 2010 required participants to "fervently love the socialist motherland [and] uphold the leadership of the Chinese Communist Party."

In contrast with the PRC, the ROC's Taoist faith also followed a collection of beliefs deeply ingrained in Chinese culture that can be termed "traditional Chinese folk religion". These beliefs may include some aspects of shamanism, ancestor worship, belief in ghosts and other spirits, and animism. Researchers and academics estimate that as much as 80 percent of the population believes in some form of traditional folk religion. Such folk religions may overlap with an individual's belief in Buddhism, Taoism, Confucianism, or other traditional Chinese religions. Traditional Chinese religions with adherents constituting less than 5 percent of the population include: I Kuan Tao, Tien Ti Chiao (Heaven Emperor Religion), Tien Te Chiao (Heaven Virtue Religion), Li-ism, Hsuan Yuan Chiao (Yellow Emperor Religion), Tian Li Chiao (Tenrikyo), Universe Maitreya Emperor Religion, Hai Tze Tao, Confucianism, Zhonghua Sheng Chiao (Chinese Holy Religion), Da Yi Chiao (Great Changes Religion), Pre-cosmic Salvationism, and Huang Chung Chiao (Yellow Middle Religion).

Islam

The State Administration for Religious Affairs places the number of Muslims in China at approximately 21 million, while independent estimates suggest that the number could be upwards of 50 million or more. According to a 2000 census, 96 percent of 20.3 million reported Muslims belong to three ethnic groups: Hui, Uyghur, and Kazakh. Most Hui Muslims live in Ningxia, Qinghai, and Gansu provinces, while Uyghur Muslims are predominantly found in Xinjiang.

The state-run Islamic Association of China (IAC) oversees the practice of Islam, though many Muslims worship outside the state system. The IAC regulates the content of sermons and the interpretation of religious scripture, exercises control over the confirmation of religious leaders, and monitors overseas pilgrimages. In 2001, the IAC established a committee to ensure that scriptures were interpreted in a manner that would serve the interests of the Chinese government and the Communist Party.

Authorities in Xinjiang impose rigid controls over religious expression, particularly over Uyghurs. Human rights reports indicate that crackdowns on religion are frequently integrated into security campaigns. Authorities monitor mosques, restrict the observation of Ramadan by government officials and students, and enact campaigns to prevent Uyghur men from wearing beards. Uyghur Muslims who worship independently have been detained and charged with conducting "illegal religious activities".

However, the suppression of the Uyghurs has more to do with the fact that they are separatists, rather than Muslims. China banned a book titled "Xing Fengsu" ("Sexual Customs") which insulted Islam and placed its authors under arrest in 1989 after protests in Lanzhou and Beijing by Chinese Hui Muslims, during which the Chinese police provided protection to the Hui Muslim protesters, and the Chinese government organized public burnings of the book. The Chinese government assisted them and gave into their demands because the Hui do not have a separatist movement, unlike the Uyghurs. Hui Muslim protesters who violently rioted by vandalizing property during the protests against the book were let off by the Chinese government and went unpunished while Uyghur protesters were imprisoned.

In 2007, anticipating the coming "Year of the Pig" in the Chinese calendar, depictions of pigs were banned from CCTV "to avoid conflicts with ethnic minorities". This is believed to refer to China's population of 20 million Muslims (to whom pigs are considered "unclean").

In response to the 2015 Charlie Hebdo shooting, Chinese state-run media attacked Charlie Hebdo for publishing the cartoons which insulted Muhammad, with the state-run Xinhua advocating limits on freedom of speech, while another state-run newspaper Global Times said the attack was "payback" for what it characterized as Western colonialism, and it also accused Charlie Hebdo of trying to incite a clash of civilizations.

Different Muslim ethnic groups in different regions of China are treated differently by the Chinese government with regards to religious freedom. Religious freedom is present for Hui Muslims, who can practice their religion, build Mosques, and have their children attend Mosques, while more controls are placed on Uyghurs in Xinjiang. Since the 1980s, Islamic private schools have been supported and permitted by the Chinese government in Muslim areas, while only Xinjiang is specifically prevented from allowing these schools because of the separatist sentiment which exists there.

The Diplomat reported that Chinese government policy towards Uyghurs in Xinjiang is not directed towards Islam in general, but rather towards aggressively stamping out the Uyghur separatist threat.

Although religious education for children is officially forbidden by law in China, the Communist party allows Hui Muslims to violate this law and have their children educated in religion and attend mosques while the law is enforced on Uyghurs. After secondary education is completed, China then allows Hui students to embark on religious studies under the direction of an Imam. China does not enforce a law against children attending mosques on non-Uyghurs in areas outside Xinjiang.

Hui Muslims who are employed by the state are allowed to fast during Ramadan unlike Uyghurs who hold the same job positions, the amount of Hui who are going on Hajj is expanding, and Hui women are allowed to wear veils, while Uyghur women are discouraged from wearing them. The Xinjiang Muslim Association in China and the Chinese embassy in Malaysia have denied that Uyghurs are banned from fasting, inviting foreigners to come see it for themselves. The Star also reported in 2021 that Uyghurs in Xinjiang made prayers for Aidilfitri.

Hui religious schools are allowed to operate a massive autonomous network of mosques and schools that are run by a Hui Sufi leader, which was formed with the approval of the Chinese government even as he admitted to attending an event where Bin Laden spoke.

Uyghur views vary by the oasis where they live. China has historically favored Turpan and Hami. Uyghurs in Turfan and Hami and their leaders like Emin Khoja allied with the Qing against Uyghurs in Altishahr. During the Qing dynasty, China enfeoffed the rulers of Turpan and Hami (Kumul) as autonomous princes, while the rest of the Uyghurs in Altishahr (the Tarim Basin) were ruled by Begs. Uyghurs from Turpan and Hami were appointed by China as officials to rule over Uyghurs in the Tarim Basin. Turpan is more economically prosperous and it views China more positively than does the rebellious Kashgar, which is the most anti-Chinese oasis. Uyghurs in Turpan are treated leniently and favorably by China with regards to religious policies, while Kashgar is subjected to controls by the government. In Turpan and Hami, religion is viewed more positively by China than religion in Kashgar and Khotan in southern Xinjiang. Both Uyghur and Han Communist officials in Turpan turn a blind eye to the law and allow religious Islamic education for Uyghur children. Celebrating at religious functions and going on Hajj to Mecca is encouraged by the Chinese government, for Uyghur members of the Communist party. From 1979–1989, 350 mosques were built in Turpan. Han, Hui, and the Chinese government is viewed more positively by Uyghurs in Turpan, where the government has given them better economic, religious, and political treatment.

The Uyghur terrorist organization East Turkestan Islamic Movement's magazine Islamic Turkistan has accused the Chinese "Muslim Brotherhood" (the Yihewani) of being responsible for the moderation of Hui Muslims and the lack of Hui joining terrorist jihadist groups in addition to blaming other things for the lack of Hui jihadists, such as the fact that for more than 300 years Hui and Uyghurs have been enemies of each other, with no separatist Islamist organizations operating among the Hui, the fact that the Hui view China as their home, and the fact that the "infidel Chinese" language is the language of the Hui.

After the communist takeover of the mainland in 1949, more than 20,000 Muslims fled to the island of Taiwan. On 23 January 2007, ROC President Chen Shui-ban personally congratulated local Muslims who had completed a pilgrimage to Mecca, and praised Taiwan's Muslim Association (Chinese Muslim Association, an organization that is fully independent from the government) for promoting frequent exchanges between Taiwan and the Islamic world. President Chen also credited practicing Muslims on Taiwan for helping to create a richer, more diverse culture on the island.

Tibetan-Muslim sectarian violence
In Tibet, the majority of Muslims are Hui people. Hatred between Tibetans and Muslims stems from events during the Muslim warlord Ma Bufang's rule in Qinghai such as Ngolok rebellions (1917–49) and the Sino-Tibetan War, but in 1949 the Communists put an end to the violence between Tibetans and Muslims, however, new Tibetan-Muslim violence broke out after China engaged in liberalization. Riots broke out between Muslims and Tibetans over incidents such as bones in soups and prices of balloons, and Tibetans accused Muslims of being cannibals who cooked humans in their soup and of contaminating food with urine. Tibetans attacked Muslim restaurants. Fires set by Tibetans which burned the apartments and shops of Muslims resulted in Muslim families being killed and wounded in the 2008 mid-March riots. Due to Tibetan violence against Muslims, the traditional Islamic white caps have not been worn by many Muslims. Scarfs were removed and replaced with hairnets by Muslim women in order to hide. Muslims prayed in secret at home when in August 2008 the Tibetans burned the Mosque. Incidents such as these which make Tibetans look bad on the international stage are covered up by the Tibetan exile community. The repression of Tibetan separatism by the Chinese government is supported by Hui Muslims. In addition, Chinese-speaking Hui have problems with Tibetan Hui (the Tibetan speaking Kache minority of Muslims).

The main Mosque in Lhasa was burned down by Tibetans and Chinese Hui Muslims were violently assaulted by Tibetan rioters in the 2008 Tibetan unrest. Tibetan exiles and foreign scholars alike ignore and do not talk about sectarian violence between Tibetan Buddhists and Muslims. The majority of Tibetans viewed the wars against Iraq and Afghanistan after 9/11 positively and it had the effect of galvanizing anti-Muslim attitudes among Tibetans and resulted in an anti-Muslim boycott against Muslim-owned businesses. Tibetan Buddhists propagate a false libel that Muslims cremate their Imams and use the ashes to convert Tibetans to Islam by making Tibetans inhale the ashes, even though the Tibetans seem to be aware that Muslims practice burial and not cremation since they frequently clash against proposed Muslim cemeteries in their area.

Since the Chinese government supports and backs up the Hui Muslims, the Tibetans deliberately attack the Hui Muslims as a way to demonstrate anti-government sentiment and because they have a background of sectarian violence against each other since Ma Bufang's rule due to their separate religions and ethnicity and Tibetans resent Hui economic domination.

In 1936, after Sheng Shicai expelled 30,000 Kazakhs from Xinjiang to Qinghai, Hui led by General Ma Bufang massacred their fellow Muslim Kazakhs, until there were 135 of them left.

From Northern Xinjiang over 7,000 Kazakhs fled to the Tibetan-Qinghai plateau region via Gansu and were wreaking massive havoc so Ma Bufang solved the problem by relegating the Kazakhs into designated pastureland in Qinghai, but Hui, Tibetans, and Kazakhs in the region continued to clash against each other.

Tibetans attacked and fought against the Kazakhs as they entered Tibet via Gansu and Qinghai.

In northern Tibet Kazakhs clashed with Tibetan soldiers and then the Kazakhs were sent to Ladakh.

Tibetan troops robbed and killed Kazakhs 400 miles east of Lhasa at Chamdo when the Kazakhs were entering Tibet.

In 1934, 1935, 1936–1938 from Qumil Eliqsan led the Kerey Kazakhs to migrate to Gansu and the amount was estimated at 18,000, and they entered Gansu and Qinghai.

Tibetan troops serving under the Dalai Lama murdered the American CIA agent Douglas Mackiernan and his two White Russian helpers because he was dressed as a Kazakh, their enemy.

Falun Gong

Following a period of meteoric growth of Falun Gong in the 1990s, the Communist Party launched a campaign to "eradicate" Falun Gong on 20 July 1999. The suppression is characterised by a multifaceted propaganda campaign, a program of enforced ideological conversion and re-education, and a variety of extralegal coercive measures such as arbitrary arrests, forced labor, and physical torture, sometimes resulting in death.

An extra-constitutional body called the 6-10 Office was created to lead the suppression of Falun Gong. The authorities mobilized the state media apparatus, judiciary, police, army, the education system, families and workplaces against the group. The campaign is driven by large-scale propaganda through television, newspaper, radio and internet. There are reports of systematic torture, illegal imprisonment, forced labor, organ harvesting and abusive psychiatric measures, with the apparent aim of forcing practitioners to recant their belief in Falun Gong.

Foreign observers estimate that hundreds of thousands and perhaps millions of Falun Gong practitioners have been detained in "re-education through labor" camps, prisons and other detention facilities for refusing to renounce the spiritual practice. Former prisoners have reported that Falun Gong practitioners consistently received "the longest sentences and worst treatment" in labor camps, and in some facilities Falun Gong practitioners formed the substantial majority of detainees.  As of 2009 at least 2,000 Falun Gong adherents had been tortured to death in the persecution campaign, with some observers putting the number much higher.

Some international observers and judicial authorities have described the campaign against Falun Gong as a genocide. In 2009, courts in Spain and Argentina indicted senior Chinese officials for genocide and crimes against humanity for their role in orchestrating the suppression of Falun Gong.

However, the Falun Gong is generally considered a spiritual movement and not a religion by the ROC government. The leading proponent of Falun Gong in Taiwan reports that membership exceeds 500,000 and continues to grow rapidly.

Organ harvesting allegation

In 2006 allegations emerged that the vital organs of non-consenting Falun Gong practitioners had been used to supply China's organ tourism industry. The Kilgour-Matas report stated in 2006, "We believe that there has been and continues today to be large scale organ seizures from unwilling Falun Gong practitioners". Ethan Gutmann interviewed over 100 witnesses and alleged that about 65,000 Falun Gong prisoners were killed for their organs from 2000 to 2008. In 2008, two United Nations Special Rapporteurs reiterated their requests for "the Chinese government to fully explain the allegation of taking vital organs from Falun Gong practitioners". The Chinese government has denied the allegation.

Religious freedom in the Republic of China
The policies and practices of the Republic of China contribute to the generally free practice of religion in contrast to the PRC. During the martial law period, religious persecution became less common by the authoritarian Nationalist government even though  restrictions on freedom were relaxed by the time martial law was lifted in 1987 with the start of democratization.

A significant percentage of the population of the ROC is nonreligious. Freedom of religion in Taiwan is strong. Taiwan's strong human rights protections, lack of state-sanctioned discrimination, and generally high regard for freedom of religion or belief earned it a joint #1 ranking alongside the Netherlands and Belgium in the 2018 Freedom of Thought Report.

Religious demography

The 2006 Government Information Office Yearbook, the Religious Affairs Section of the Ministry of the Interior (MOI) states that 35 percent of the population consider themselves Buddhist and 33 percent Taoist. While the overwhelming majority of religious adherents are either Buddhist or Taoist, many people also consider themselves both Buddhist and Taoist .

While the ROC authorities do not collect or independently verify statistics on religious affiliation, they maintain registration statistics voluntarily reported by religious organizations. Officials from the MOI Religious Affairs Section believe these voluntarily reported statistics significantly understate the number of people in Taiwan who adhere to religious beliefs and participate in some form of religious activities. The MOI Religious Affairs Section estimates that approximately 50 percent of the population regularly participates in some form of organized religious practice, as distinguished from "traditional Chinese folk religions", and an estimated 14 percent of the population is atheist.

Other religions include Baháʼí and Mahikari.

Religious beliefs cross political and geographical lines. Members of the political leadership practice various faiths.

Religious conversion
There are no reports of forced religious conversion in the ROC territories.

Improvements and Positive Developments in Respect for Religious Freedom
The MOI promotes interfaith understanding among religious groups by sponsoring symposiums or helping to defray the expenses of privately sponsored symposiums on religious issues. The MOI also publishes and updates an introduction to major religious beliefs and groups based on material provided by the groups. This introduction is also available on the internet. In May 2006, the MOI invited some 100 leaders from religious organizations to participate in a two-day tour of outstanding social services organizations operated by religious charities, to foster cooperation among organizations with similar social welfare goals. The MOI holds an annual ceremony to honor religious groups for their contributions to public service, social welfare, and social harmony. Some 170 different organizations and individuals are recognized.

Societal abuses and discrimination
There have been no reports of societal abuses or discrimination based on religious belief or practice in the ROC-controlled Taiwan. Prominent societal leaders have taken positive steps to promote religious tolerance. For instance, the Taiwan Council for Religion and Peace, the China Religious Believers Association, and the Taiwan Religious Association are private organizations that promote greater understanding and tolerance among adherents of different religions. These associations and various religious groups occasionally sponsor symposiums to promote mutual understanding. The Taiwan Conference on Religion and Peace sponsors summer seminars every year to help college students understand the practice of major religions in Taiwan.

See also
Religion in Mainland China
Religion in Taiwan
Human rights in Taiwan
Chinese laws regarding religious activities

References

Bibliography

External links

2015 Report on International Religious Freedom: China (Includes Tibet, Hong Kong, and Macau) - most recent Report on International Religious Freedom from the U.S. Department of State's Bureau of Democracy, Human Rights, and Labor
Reports and publications about religious freedom in China from the United States Commission on International Religious Freedom – includes annual reports from 2003–present and other documents
 United States Bureau of Democracy, Human Rights and Labor. Republic of China: International Religious Freedom Report 2007. This article incorporates text from this source, which is in the public domain.

Religion in China
China
Human rights in China
Torture in China
Human rights in Taiwan
Religion in Taiwan